Ernest William Barnes  (1 April 1874 – 29 November 1953) was a British mathematician and scientist who later became a liberal theologian and bishop.

He was educated at King Edward's School, Birmingham, and Trinity College, Cambridge. He was Master of the Temple from 1915 to 1919. He was made Bishop of Birmingham in 1924, the only bishop appointed during Ramsay MacDonald's first term in office. His modernist views, in particular objection to Reservation, led to conflict with the Anglo-Catholics in his diocese. A biography by his son, Sir John Barnes, Ahead of His Age: Bishop Barnes of Birmingham, was published in 1979.

Birth and education
Barnes was the eldest of four sons of John Starkie Barnes and Jane Elizabeth Kerry, both elementary school head-teachers. In 1883 Barnes' father was appointed Inspector of Schools in Birmingham, a position that he occupied throughout the rest of his working life. Barnes was educated at King Edward's School, Birmingham, and in 1893 went up to Cambridge as a Scholar of Trinity College. He was bracketed Second Wrangler in 1896 and was placed in the first division of the first class in Part II of the Mathematical Tripos in 1897. In the following year he was awarded the first Smith's Prize and was duly elected to a Trinity Fellowship. During his time as a Fellow he served on the committee of Cambridge University Liberal Club from 1899 to 1901. He was appointed a lecturer in mathematics in 1902, junior dean in 1906–1908 and a tutor in 1908. He graduated ScD of the University of Cambridge in 1907 and was elected a Fellow of the Royal Society in 1909. In the years that followed, Barnes was assigned to be Ramanujan's tutor and agreed with G. H. Hardy's assessment of his brilliance.

Ministry
In the same year he became a lecturer in mathematics, Barnes was made deacon by the Bishop of London and from 1906 to 1908 was Junior Dean of Trinity. In 1915, Barnes left Cambridge, and his career as a professional mathematician, upon his appointment as Master of the Temple in London. This was followed in 1918 by a canonry of Westminster Abbey and finally, in 1924, by consecration to the Bishopric of Birmingham, an office he held until April 1953, when he had to retire on account of ill-health. He died at his home in Sussex at the age of 79, survived by his wife and two sons.  A bronze memorial tablet to him, as the third bishop of Birmingham, was erected in the south aisle of Birmingham Cathedral, near where his ashes, together with those of his wife, are placed under the pavement marked by a slab with the initials "EWB".

Controversies
Barnes was perhaps the best known liberal bishop of his time, identified with the modernist or broad church movement. His episcopate was marked by continual controversy.

His book The Rise of Christianity (1947) attacked many Christian claims, including the Virgin Birth and the bodily resurrection of Christ. This led to calls that he should resign as a bishop. This Barnes refused to do. Earlier he had written Should Such a Faith Offend? (1927) and Scientific Theory and Religion (1933), and he was a contributor to 18 other books. His attack on Francis of Assisi as "probably verminous" drew a rebuke in verse from G. K. Chesterton.

He was also politically active. In 1940, he lost a libel case in which he had attacked the Cement Makers' Federation for allegedly holding up the supply of cement, for their own profit at a time of great national need, in the construction of air-raid shelters. Undaunted by this set-back, Barnes returned to his accusations on the cement ring in a speech he delivered in the House of Lords the following year.

Pacifism and eugenics
He was an uncompromising pacifist, and spoke out against British participation in the Second World War. He also expressed eugenic views. Though a member of the Eugenic Society from 1924 until his death in 1953, it was not until after the Second World War that he openly argued in favour of voluntary sterilisation as a means to overcome the apparent prevalence of "mental deficiency" in society. Several of these eugenic-themed lectures gained significant newspaper coverage in The Times and The Manchester Guardian, sparking a fervent public debate in which inevitable – if not entirely justifiable – parallels were drawn between Barnes' arguments and Nazi ideology. In his latter years Barnes was thus a pacifist, religious leader and campaigner for the perceived declining cause of eugenics.

Personal life
In 1916, Barnes married Adelaide Caroline Theresa Ward, daughter of Sir Adolphus Ward. Together they had two sons: John was a diplomat, who served as ambassador to Israel and the Netherlands; and William, a public servant and philanthropist.

See also

Barnes G-function
Barnes integral

References

1874 births
1953 deaths
People educated at King Edward's School, Birmingham
Alumni of Trinity College, Cambridge
Fellows of Trinity College, Cambridge
Fellows of King's College London
19th-century English mathematicians
20th-century English mathematicians
20th-century Church of England bishops
20th-century English theologians
20th-century English Anglican priests
Anglican pacifists
Fellows of the Royal Society
Bishops of Birmingham
English Christian pacifists
Second Wranglers
People associated with Westminster Abbey
Masters of the Temple